Samson (1949–1981) was a male silverback western lowland gorilla given to the Washington Park Zoo in Milwaukee Wisconsin by the Pabst Brewing Company. He often hit the windows in frustration and managed to break the glass four times. He was moved to the Milwaukee County Zoo in 1959, and quickly became the main attraction. Samson was one of the largest gorillas in captivity.

Main Attraction
Samson was the main attraction for the Washington Park, Milwaukee Zoo in Milwaukee from the moment he arrived. The Zoo celebrated his fifth birthday with soda and a cake in front of his cage. Samson attracted huge crowds that came to see him in his tiled stall every day. He appeared on television, in magazines and even on a Milwaukee bus pass. Because of Samson's isolation, glass pounding, and expressions: people saw him as sad, bored and lonely. His poor living conditions also seemed to contribute to that belief.

Death and legacy

Samson died November 27, 1981; the cause of death was massive myocardial fibrosis. After Samson's death in 1981, the Milwaukee County Zoo preserved his semen for use in attempted insemination of several gorillas from other zoos. The inseminations all failed. Samson is now honored with a bronze statue of his head near the gorilla exhibit at the zoo.

The Milwaukee Public Museum recreated Samson in an exhibit: Samson Remembered. The recreation of Samson was done by Wendy Christensen in 2007.

See also
Milwaukee County Zoo
Koko (gorilla)
List of individual apes
Charles the Gorilla
Gargantua (gorilla)

References

1949 animal births
1981 animal deaths
Individual gorillas